Martin Schanche (born 1 January 1945), nicknamed "Mister Rallycross", is a Norwegian former racing driver and politician.

Biography
Schanche was born in Trondheim, as the son of a German WW2 airplane pilot, who lost his life in a plane crash only three months later, and a Norwegian mother. The little boy grew up as an adopted child of a Norwegian couple at the tiny village of Leirpollskogen in Tana, the most northern part of Norway. Today he lives in Drøbak, together with his German-born wife Birgit and their daughter Melissa, a Norwegian Weightlifting Champion of the categories for females. Martin Schanche has also two other children from a former marriage, a daughter by the name of Elisabeth, and a son named Martin junior, well known in the Norwegian rallying scene.

He started his racing career rather late, only in 1972 when he was already 27 years old. Due to his attacking driving style he was quickly nicknamed "Villmannen fra Tana" ("The Wild Man from Tana") by his fellow Norwegian competitors. In 1975 he won a silver medal in the Norwegian Ice Racing Championships. Between 1976 and 2001 he competed in Rallycross, and became the FIA European champion of 1978, 1979, 1981, 1984, 1991 and 1995, as well as the vice-champion for another eight years. With his 74 main category wins Schanche is still yet the undisputed record holder concerning the amount of overall victories in rounds counting towards the FIA European Championships for Rallycross Drivers. Beside his rallycross campaigns and four World Sports Car seasons he was a starter of the 1980 Rally Sweden, the 1982 Rally of Great Britain, and failed to set a new track record in the 1984 Pikes Peak International Hill Climb (PPIHC), due to a flat right front tyre.

Since retiring from motorsport he has embarked on a second career as a municipality politician in Frogn for the Progress Party. In 2003 he was the subject of a lot of nationwide attention after he slapped the chin of his political opponent Torgeir Micaelsen of the Labour Party at the end of a school debate in Drammen because Micaelsen, during the debate and in front of the public, had called him a coward. That attention made him an often imitated character in Norwegian radio. As of 2006, he also has been working as a consultant for Prodrive on the work of Subarus WRC-cars. While active in rallycross, Schanche himself engineered transmissions and differentials for his cars. His company later on manufactured parts and modified parts for rally- and rallycross-cars. Nowadays Schanche is working on projects with concepts for new combustion-engines (see External links section below).

Schanche is holder of a helicopter license and has operated his own helicopters. In 2000 he was involved in a crash in which his daughter was slightly injured.

Racing record
Key: DSQ = excluded from whole event; DNS = did not start; NC = not classified for points; SUS = suspended; = dropped score, due to championship rules

Complete FIA European Rallycross Cup results

Complete FIA European Rallycross Championship results

TC Division

Division 2

Division 1*

* Division 2 was rebranded as Division 1 in 1997.

Complete 24 Hours of Le Mans results

Publications
 Martin Schanche, by Sverre Amundsen, Racing Revyen 1979, 126 pages, Norwegian language, .
 Martin Schanche – i fyr og flamme, by Rolf Nordberg, Cappelens Forlag 1981, 136 pages, Norwegian language, .
 Martin – så glad, så sint, så fort…, by Sverre Inge Apenes, Godbok 1986, 158 pages, Norwegian language, .
 Martin – Historien han aldri har fortalt, by Asle T. Johansen, Fri Flyt AS 2016, 240 pages, Norwegian language, .

References

External links

 Schanche working on revolutionary combustion-engine (in Norwegian)
 Schanche working on unique engine (in Swedish)

1945 births
Living people
Sportspeople from Trondheim
People from Tana, Norway
People from Frogn
Norwegian racing drivers
24 Hours of Le Mans drivers
Progress Party (Norway) politicians
Akershus politicians
World Sportscar Championship drivers
European Rallycross Championship drivers